A collection of subsets of a topological space  is said to be locally finite if each point in the space has a neighbourhood that intersects only finitely many of the sets in the collection.

In the mathematical field of topology, local finiteness is a property of collections of subsets of a topological space.  It is fundamental in the study of paracompactness and topological dimension.

Note that the term locally finite has different meanings in other mathematical fields.

Examples and properties

A finite collection of subsets of a topological space is locally finite.

If a collection of sets is locally finite, the collection of all closures of these sets is also locally finite. The reason for this is that if an open set containing a point intersects the closure of a set, it necessarily intersects the set itself, hence a neighborhood can intersect at most the same number of closures (it may intersect fewer, since two distinct, indeed disjoint, sets can have the same closure). The converse, however, can fail if the closures of the sets are not distinct.

Compact spaces

Every locally finite collection of subsets of a compact space must be finite. Indeed, let  be a locally finite family of subsets of a compact space  . Since this union is the whole space , it follows that  intersects only a finite number of subsets in the collection . And since  is composed of subsets of  every member of  must intersect , thus  is finite.

A topological space in which every open cover admits a locally finite open refinement is called paracompact. Every locally finite collection of subsets of a topological space is also point-finite. A topological space in which every open cover admits a point-finite open refinement is called metacompact.

Second countable spaces

No uncountable cover of a Lindelöf space can be locally finite, by essentially the same argument as in the case of compact spaces.  In particular, no uncountable cover of a second-countable space is locally finite.

Closed sets

A finite union of closed sets is always closed. One can readily give an example of an infinite union of closed sets that is not closed. However, if we consider a locally finite collection of closed sets, the union is closed. To see this we note that if  is a point outside the union of this locally finite collection of closed sets, we merely choose a neighbourhood  of  that intersects this collection at only finitely many of these sets. Define a bijective map from the collection of sets that  intersects to  thus giving an index to each of these sets. Then for each set, choose an open set  containing  that doesn't intersect it.

Countably locally finite collections

Countably local finiteness is a key hypothesis in the Nagata–Smirnov metrization theorem, which states that a topological space is metrizable if and only if it is regular and has a countably locally finite basis.

See also

References

 

Families of sets
General topology
Properties of topological spaces